Elongation factor Tu, mitochondrial is a protein that in humans is encoded by the TUFM gene. It is an EF-Tu homolog.

References

Further reading